Children of the World is a 1976 album by the Bee Gees. The first single, "You Should Be Dancing", went to No. 1 in the US and Canada, and was a top ten hit in numerous other territories. It was the group's fourteenth album (twelfth internationally). The album was re-issued on CD by Reprise Records and Rhino Records in 2006. This was the first record featuring the Gibb-Galuten-Richardson production team which would have many successful collaborations in the following years.

Background
Because their manager Robert Stigwood had ended his US distribution arrangement with Atlantic Records, Atlantic producer Arif Mardin, who had produced the Bee Gees' prior two albums, was no longer permitted to work with the group. In an effort to retain the same sound, the group recorded at the same studios (Criteria Studios in Miami). At first, they recruited producer Richard Perry, but they parted company after only a couple of weeks over the musical direction the group should take. At this point the Bee Gees decided to produce the album themselves, with Barry Gibb taking the lead role, along with engineer Karl Richardson. They added young musician and arranger Albhy Galuten to the control room as musical adviser. The new team saw the group through a series of top selling recordings over the next four years.

Recording
The album was recorded from 19 January to 30 March, at Criteria Studios in Miami, when they recorded "You Should Be Dancing", "Love So Right", "Subway", "Love Me", "You Stepped Into My Life", "The Way It Was", "Walk Before You Run" (unreleased), "The Feel" (unreleased) and "Lovers" which had Robin singing lead in falsetto. All the songs were finished in Quebec, except the two unreleased songs and "Walk Before You Run" which was written by Barry Gibb with Stephen Stills. During a break recording Children of the World , Robin and Maurice Gibb returned in England to spend time with their families, while Barry stayed in Miami to mix the new single and to record "The Way It Was". From 2 April to 26 May, the group recorded songs in Le Studio, Quebec. "Rest Your Love on Me" (recorded 2 May) was not included on the album but it was used as the B-side of "Too Much Heaven" in 1978.

Release
The  album was released in September 1976. Four singles were released.  "You Should Be Dancing" in June 1976 (UK) / July 1976 (US); "Love So Right" in September 1976; "Boogie Child" in January 1977; and "Children of the World" in February 1977.  "You Should Be Dancing"  went to No. 1 in the US. "Love So Right" and "Boogie Child" reached No. 3 and No. 12 respectively in the US. "Love Me" was a hit for Yvonne Elliman and "You Stepped into My Life" was recorded by Wayne Newton in 1979. Barry Gibb felt that other tracks could also be hits.

Critical reception

Bruce Eder in a retrospective review for AllMusic describes this album as the group's second R&B album and described "Love So Right" as a "beautiful soul ballad".

Track listing
All tracks written by Barry, Robin and Maurice Gibb, except where noted.

Personnel
Bee Gees
Barry Gibb – lead, harmony and backing vocals, rhythm guitar
Robin Gibb – lead, harmony and backing vocals
Maurice Gibb – harmony and backing vocals; bass guitar except #3, 4 (side 2)

Backing band
Alan Kendall – lead guitar
Dennis Bryon – drums
Blue Weaver – keys, synth, piano, Arp, Moog Synthesizer

Additional musicians
Joe Lala – percussion
Gary Brown – saxophone
George "Chocolate" Perry – bass guitar on #3, 4 (side 2)
Stephen Stills – percussion on #1 (side 1)
Peter Graves, Whit Sidener, Kenny Faulk, Neil Bonsanti, Bill Purse – horn

Production
Karl Richardson – engineer, producer
John Blanche, Ed Marshal – engineer
Nick Balgona – additional engineer
Albhy Galuten – producer

Charts

Weekly charts

Year-end charts

Certifications and sales

References

1976 albums
Bee Gees albums
Polydor Records albums
RSO Records albums
Soul albums by English artists
Albums produced by Barry Gibb
Albums produced by Robin Gibb
Albums produced by Maurice Gibb
Albums recorded at Le Studio